Bay Shore High School is a public high school located in Bay Shore, New York. The school serves about 2,000 students in grades 9 to 12. It is part of Bay Shore Schools. Bay Shore High School is an International Baccalaureate school.

Graduates of Woodhull School (PK-6) of the Fire Island School District can attend Bay Shore secondary schools, Bay Shore high included.

Curriculum
Bay Shore High School, which follows the New York State Syllabus, offers courses in the following areas: English, Cultural Arts, Mathematics and Computer Technology, Occupational Education, World Languages (Latin, Spanish, Mandarin Chinese and French), Science and Social Studies. Additionally, the high school offers an Honors Program, Humanities Program, Math/Science/Technology/Career Program, Advanced Placement Courses, a Law sequence (7 courses), and Project Adventure (a physical education program that builds teamwork and trust.) Bay Shore High School began offering the International Baccalaureate Diploma Program in 2009.

Sports
Bay Shore High School has won the New York State Softball Championship 7 years: 1994, 1995, 1997, 1998, 2000, 2005 and 2010. The Girls’ Lacrosse Team, Girls’ Cross Country, Winter and Spring Track teams have won league and county titles as well as individual student national achievements. Field Hockey has been division champions in the past; Boys’ Golf team went undefeated in 2010. In 2022, Boys' Tennis won division championships in both singles and doubles. Other teams achieving post-season play include: Football, Boys’ Basketball, Boys’ Lacrosse, Boys’ Baseball, and Girls’ Tennis. The program also boasts 17 NYS Scholar-Athlete teams, 3 News 12 Scholar-Athletes, and a Dellacave Award Winner; Varsity Softball Coach was selected to the Suffolk County Hall of Fame in 2010, and the Health, Physical Education and Athletics Director was named Health and Physical Education Director of the Year by the Council of Administrators of the NYS Association of Health, Physical Education, Recreation and Dance. In 2017, Bay Shore founded the first high school Esports team in New York State and has subsequently won two North American Championships.

Computers and Technology
Computer courses are taught on both Apple and Windows-based PC’s. Courses are offered in computer music theory application programming and multi-media. There is a recording studio accessible to all students to encourage original music composition.

Notable alumni

Harvey Milk, human rights activist, elected supervisor of District 5 of the City and County of San Francisco
Brian Ehlers, former professional basketball player
Judith Regan, publisher
Robert Metcalfe, an electrical engineer who co-invented Ethernet, founded 3Com and formulated Metcalfe's Law.
Corey Swinson, St. Louis Rams defensive tackle
Amy Goodman, broadcast journalist, investigative reporter
Ryan Cassata, singer-songwriter, American activist, public speaker 
Duncan L. Niederauer, businessman

References

External links
Bay Shore High School website

Educational institutions in the United States with year of establishment missing
International Baccalaureate schools in New York (state)
Islip (town), New York
Schools in Suffolk County, New York
Public high schools in New York (state)
1893 establishments in New York (state)